Steven Siewert is an Australian photojournalist and art photographer.

Siewert's photographs have appeared in the Sydney Morning Herald and the book, "The Last Anzacs: Lest We Forget" with the author Tony Stephens. He was twice a recipient of the Nikon/Walkley Portrait Prize, winning in 2008 for “Waiting for Wanda Jackson”, published in the Good Weekend. In this same year he won a Walkley for his series on Australian rockabillies, from which the portrait was drawn. The series was subject of an exhibition at the Museum of Sydney. In 2001, Siewert was also awarded an Asialink fellowship to work in Bangkok, Thailand for Asian newspaper, The Nation.  Siewert's photography has been included in solo and group exhibitions at the Leica gallery in Solms, Germany, the Museum of Sydney, the Centre for Contemporary Photography in Melbourne, the State Library of NSW and Albury Regional Art Gallery.He is a former member of the Australian Oculi collective.

Books 
 The Last Anzacs: Lest We Forget, Tony Stephens (Author) and Siewert, Fremantle Arts Centre Press (April 2003)

Exhibitions 
 Centre for Contemporary Photography, Melbourne Australia, 2005
 Rockabilly: living the 50s, Museum of Sydney, 2008

References

External links
Gallery of Siewert's photos at The Sydney Morning Herald
 Siewert's portfolio 

Australian photographers
Year of birth missing (living people)
Living people
Australian photojournalists